This is a list of military and trading forts established in the U.S. State of Colorado.

History

The initial forts, built in the first half of the 19th century, were early communities of commerce between Native Americans, trappers, and traders. William Butler, who wrote about the fur trade in Colorado, stated that there were 24 trading posts built in the pre-territorial area of what is now Colorado. The trading posts were of varying sizes. Gantt's Post had several small wooden buildings located along Fountain Creek. Near Pueblo, Fort Le Duc (Buzzard's Roost) was a small settlement. Bent's Old Fort was a large adobe stockade on the Arkansas River. Multiple trading posts were built along a 13-mile stretch of the South Platte River in the late 1830s: Fort Jackson, Fort Lupton, and Fort Vasquez. In the early 1840s, the fur trade collapsed and most of the trading posts were closed, although some served early communities of miners and farmers. Bent's Old Fort continued to operate as it was located on the Santa Fe Trail, serving people from the United States and the New Spain areas of what is now New Mexico.

Table of Colorado forts

Notes

See also

Colorado
Bibliography of Colorado
Index of Colorado-related articles
Outline of Colorado
Colorado statistical areas
Geography of Colorado
History of Colorado
List of counties in Colorado
List of places in Colorado
List of mountain passes in Colorado
List of mountain peaks of Colorado
List of mountain ranges of Colorado
List of populated places in Colorado
List of census-designated places in Colorado
List of county seats in Colorado
List of forts in Colorado
List of ghost towns in Colorado
List of historic places in Colorado
List of municipalities in Colorado
List of post offices in Colorado
List of rivers of Colorado
List of protected areas of Colorado

References

External links

Colorado state government website
Colorado tourism website
History Colorado website

 
Colorado geography-related lists
Colorado history-related lists
Lists of buildings and structures in Colorado
Lists of places in Colorado
Colorado, List of forts in